A Nahuatl name is a given name in the Nahuatl language that was used by the Aztecs.

Aztecs

There was a greater variety of Nahuatl names for Aztec males than for Aztec females. The meaning of the Aztec female names were mostly about birth order.

References

Nahuatl words and phrases
Names by culture